Visa requirements for Romanian citizens are the administrative entry restrictions by the authorities of other territories affecting citizens of Romania. As of 11 January 2023, Romanian citizens had visa-free or visa on arrival access to 175 countries and territories, ranking the Romanian passport 17th in terms of travel freedom according to the Henley Passport Index.

Visa requirements map

Visa requirements

Dependent, disputed or unrecognized territories

Unrecognized or partially recognized countries

Dependent and autonomous territories

Non-ordinary passports
Holders of various categories of official Romanian passports have additional visa-free access to the following countries:
 : diplomatic or service passports
 : diplomatic or service passports
 : diplomatic or service passports
 : diplomatic or service passports
 : diplomatic, official or service passports
 : diplomatic passports
 : diplomatic passports
 : diplomatic or service passports
 : diplomatic or official passports
 : diplomatic or official passports
 : diplomatic and service passports
 : diplomatic, official or service passports
 : diplomatic or service passports
 : diplomatic or official passports
 : diplomatic or service passports
 : diplomatic, official or service passports
 : (diplomatic or service passports)

Holders of diplomatic or service passports of any country have visa-free access to Cape Verde, Ethiopia, Mali and Zimbabwe.

Non-visa restrictions
A Romanian identity card is valid for travel to most of the European countries

Statistics

Foreign travel by Romanians
These were the numbers of Romanian visitors to various countries in 2014:

Right to consular protection in non-EU countries

When in a non-EU country where there is no Romanian embassy, Romanian citizens as EU citizens have the right to get consular protection from the embassy of any other EU country present in that country.

See also List of diplomatic missions of Romania.

See also

 Visa requirements for European Union citizens
 Romanian passport
 Foreign relations of Romania

References and Notes
References

Notes

Romania
Foreign relations of Romania